The 1982 Audi British Open Championships was held at the Bromley Town Squash Club with the later stages being held at the Churchill Theatre, Bromley, Greater London from 29 March - 8 April 1982. Jahangir Khan won his first title defeating Hiddy Jahan in the final. Defending champion and eight times winner Geoff Hunt the number two seed withdrew through injury just before the tournament started.

Seeds

Draw and results
Source:

Final
 Jahangir Khan beat  Hiddy Jahan 9-2 10-9 9-3

Section 1

Section 2

References

Men's British Open Squash Championships
Men's British Open Championship
Men's British Open Squash Championship
Men's British Open Squash Championship
Men's British Open Squash Championship
Men's British Open Squash Championship
Squash competitions in London
Sport in the London Borough of Bromley